"Again" is a song by American actress and singer Noah Cyrus featuring fellow American singer and rapper XXXTentacion, and was released on September 22, 2017.

Music video
The music video was released on the same day of the single's release; it has over 126 million views as of March 2023. XXXTentacion does not appear in the song's music video, as he was incarcerated at the time of its filming. It was filmed in Waverley Cemetery on top of the cliffs at Bronte in the eastern suburbs of Sydney, Australia.

Critical reception
Tatiana Cirisano from Billboard states that "The fiery new track, which arrived along with a music video today (September 22), layers Cyrus' soulful, breathy vocal in the vein of Florence and the Machine's Florence Welch over drum kicks and industrial, metallic production. Meanwhile, XXXTentacion slides in for a slurred, slow-burning verse about being 'somewhere in between in love and broken.' The music video is similarly dark, with Cyrus looming about a graveyard."

Charts

Release history

Certifications

References

2017 songs
2017 singles
Noah Cyrus songs
XXXTentacion songs
Songs written by XXXTentacion
Songs written by Noah Cyrus
Songs written by Labrinth
Song recordings produced by Labrinth
Syco Music singles